Giacomo Venturi (born 2 January 1992) is an Italian footballer who plays for  club Reggiana.

Biography
Born in Faenza, Emilia–Romagna, Venturi started his career at Bologna. He was the reserve team keeper from 2007 to 2011. On 25 July 2011 Venturi left for Bellaria – Igea Marina in temporary deal. Venturi played 37 out of possible 38 match for the club in 2011–12 Lega Pro Seconda Divisione. Venturi also received a first team shirt number in 2010–11 Serie A.

On 17 July 2012 Venturi received a call-up from Gubbio.

On 10 July 2013 Venturi left for San Marino Calcio in temporary deal, along with Gianluca Draghetti and Manuel Gavilán. Venturi made his debut in the first round of 2013–14 Coppa Italia Lega Pro.

On 10 July 2014 he was signed by Cremonese on free transfer.

On 2 August 2019 he signed a two-year contract with Reggiana.

International career
Venturi started his national team career in 2005 Christmas Youth Event. He was one of the few born 1992 players in that event, which was intend for 1990 and 1991 players. In 2007, he entered another training camp for born 1992–93 players. He finally entered the Italy national under-17 football team in November 2008. However, he did not made his debut. In the new season Venturi received a call-up to Italy national under-18 football team. He also travelled to Nigeria with U17 team (de facto U18 team of 2009–10 season or U17 in 2008–09 season) for 2009 FIFA U-17 World Cup. He did not play any game either, which Mattia Perin was the first choice. Venturi received a call-up for goalkeeper training camp after returned from Africa in November 2009. However Venturi only received another call-up a year later in 2010 goalkeeper training camp.

Venturi finally returned to national youth team in December 2011 for Italy national under-20 football team. The unofficial charity match U20 beat Italy U21 Serie B 1–0. In January 2012 he received a call-up against Macedonia. In February Venturi was dropped as Perin returned to the squad. However, in April Perin withdrew from the squad again and Venturi was re-called. The match 
Venturi substituted Alessandro Iacobucci at half time. Italy had a clean sheet in the second half and beat Denmark 3–1.

References

External links
 FIGC  
 Football.it Profile 

1992 births
People from Faenza
Living people
Italian footballers
Italy youth international footballers
Association football goalkeepers
Bologna F.C. 1909 players
A.C. Bellaria Igea Marina players
A.S. Gubbio 1910 players
A.S.D. Victor San Marino players
U.S. Cremonese players
Vis Pesaro dal 1898 players
Ravenna F.C. players
Serie C players
Serie D players
Footballers from Emilia-Romagna
Sportspeople from the Province of Ravenna